Chhurpi or durkha is a traditional cheese consumed in Nepal and Tibet. The two varieties of chhurpi are a soft variety (consumed usually as a side dish with rice) and a hard variety (chewed like betel).

Preparation
Chhurpi is prepared in a local dairy or at home from buttermilk. The buttermilk is boiled and the solid mass that is obtained is separated from the liquid and wrapped and hung in a thin cloth to drain out the water. The product is rather like the Italian ricotta, which also is made from whey. It is soft, white, and neutral in taste. However, it is often left to ferment a bit to acquire a tangy taste.

To prepare the hard variety, the soft chhurpi is wrapped in a jute bag and pressed hard to get rid of the water. After it dries, it is cut into small cuboidal pieces and hung over fire to harden it further.

Consumption
Soft chhurpi is consumed in a variety of ways, including cooking with green vegetables as savoury dishes, as a filling for momo, grinding with tomatoes and chillies for senpen ( chutney)and as a soup. In the mountainous regions of Tibet, chhurpi is consumed as a substitute for vegetables because it is an excellent source of protein.

Hard chhurpi is usually consumed by keeping it in the mouth to moisten it, letting parts of it become soft, and then chewing it like a gum. In this manner, one block of chhurpi can last up to two hours.

See also
 Tibetan cheese
 Shosha (cheese)
 List of cheeses
 List of Tibetan dishes

References

Bhutanese cuisine
Indian cheeses
Nepalese cuisine
Tibetan cheeses
Tibetan cuisine
Yak's-milk cheeses